Christa Bäckman (born 1 August 1962) is a Swedish archer. She competed in the women's individual and team events at the 1996 Summer Olympics. At the World Masters in Turin in 2013 she won Gold.

References

External links
 

1962 births
Living people
Swedish female archers
Olympic archers of Sweden
Archers at the 1996 Summer Olympics
People from Vänersborg Municipality
Sportspeople from Västra Götaland County
20th-century Swedish women